As of 2007, there are a total of 21 covered bridges in Columbia County, Pennsylvania, in the United States. The number of covered bridges in Columbia County is the third highest number of covered bridges in any one county in Pennsylvania, behind Washington County and Lancaster County. Columbia County is also home to one of two sets of twin covered bridges in the United States.

By 1962, a large number of the covered bridges in Columbia County were experiencing weathering. During this year, Columbia County began working on the preservation of the damaged bridges.

There is an organization known as the Columbia County Covered Bridges Association that has existed since 1991 and supports the presence of covered bridges in the county. The county commissioner of Columbia County, Chris Young, is also a supporter of Columbia County's covered bridges, stating that "When you stand on a covered bridge, you're actually going back in time". 18 of the covered bridges are open to vehicle traffic, as of 2002, and these are maintained by officials of Columbia County. The remainder of the bridges are maintained by the Columbia County Covered Bridges Association. A number of the covered bridges are attractions for local and regional tourism. They are also used for picnics and fishing.

A number of the covered bridges were damaged during Tropical Storm Lee in 2011. Three of these bridges were the Josiah Hess Covered Bridge No. 122, the Davis Covered Bridge, and the Rupert Covered Bridge No. 56. The Josiah Hess Covered Bridge No. 122 received some damage to its abutments. The Davis Covered Bridge was closed after the tropical storm. The Rupert Covered Bridge No. 56 sustained minor damage from a tree branch that went through its side.

Statistics and history
The existing covered bridges in Columbia County are spread across at least 11 townships. Out of these, four are in Fishing Creek Township, five are in Cleveland Township, two are in Greenwood Township, two are in Jackson Township, and two are in Franklin Township. The rest of the townships in Columbia County have one or zero covered bridges.

While fewer than 20 covered bridges remain in Columbia County in the 21st century, a total of 116 covered bridges have been built in the county, meaning that 97 covered bridges in the county have been destroyed. Of these, nine were destroyed in the 1800s, including one, the Berwick-Nescopeck Covered Bridge, that was destroyed in the late 1830s. Considerably more covered bridges were destroyed in the 1900s. In this century, a total of 60 covered bridges were lost. Two more covered bridges were destroyed in the 21st century. Additionally, 17 covered bridges were lost at an unknown date.

Table

See also 
 List of covered bridges on the National Register of Historic Places in Pennsylvania
 List of covered bridges in Lancaster County, Pennsylvania
 List of covered bridges of Bradford, Sullivan and Lycoming Counties
 National Register of Historic Places

References

External links 
 Pennsylvania's Covered Bridges - For information on non-existent covered bridges

Tourist attractions in Columbia County, Pennsylvania
Bridges in Columbia County, Pennsylvania
Covered bridges in Pennsylvania